You Owe Me may refer to:

"You Owe Me" (Nas song), 2000
"You Owe Me" (Chainsmokers song), 2018
"U.O.Me (You Owe Me)", single by Luv' 1978
"You Owe Me", song by Cows from Sexy Pee Story 1993
"You Owe Me", song by Michelle Wright written Craig Wiseman from For Me It's You  1996  
"You Owe Me", song by Scarface from My Homies 1998 and The Best of Scarface 2002
"You Owe Me", song by Danny from Charm (album) 2006 and Behind the Beats, Vol. 2 2007
"You Owe Me", song by Soulsavers from Angels & Ghosts 2015